Pomerium is an American early music choral group founded by Alexander Blachly at the University of Notre Dame in 1972. The group has fostered the careers of early music performers including Julianne Baird, Drew Minter, and the members of Anonymous 4.

References

External links
 Official website
 

Early music groups
Musical groups established in 1972
1972 establishments in Indiana
University of Notre Dame